Thabo Mngomeni (born 24 June 1969, Cape Town, Western Cape) is a South African former Association football midfielder.

After starting his professional career at Cape Town Spurs and having a brief spell at Manning Rangers, Mngomeni became a household name in South Africa playing for Bush Bucks and Orlando Pirates. He also had a brief spell at Hellenic before retirement.

He played for South Africa national soccer team and was a participant at the 2002 FIFA World Cup.

Cape Town Spurs
He was recruited by former Kaizer Chiefs, Cape Town Spurs and Hellenic player, Sergio Dos Santos from an Eastern Cape amateur team, Tembu Royals. He left Spurs after two loan deals claiming that his coach, Mich D'Avray "hated him with a passion and he didn't know why".

Umtata Bush Bucks
He first heard of the doping test in 1996 when he was informed by club officials who were aware that he smoked marijuana. Since Mngomeni was a rastafarian he only smoked marijuana during pre-season.

Orlando Pirates
Mngomeni would play for Orlando Pirates between 1998 and 2002 and become the club captain, leading them to the league title in 2001. It was during this period that he also became a regular at national level, and was one of very few locally-based players in the South African squad during that period.

International career
He made his debut for the national football side at 29 in a 1–0 victory over Angola in 1998.
All in all he played for the national team on 38 occasions, scoring six goals. He won the 2001 CAF Goal of the Year, for his bicycle kick against Congo.

Retirement
After joining Hellenic his career came to an end and he retired because of a knee injury at the age of 33.

After retirement
He has coached at a number of Vodacom League teams in Cape Town. He completed his SAFA Level 2 coaching course.
In 2022, he launched the Thabo Mngomeni Foundation, and has been coaching in the rural areas of the Eastern Cape province.

Personal life
He is the older brother of Thando Mngomeni. He is married and has five daughters. He lives in Eerste River in Cape Town

Career statistics

International goals

See also

 List of African association football families

References

External links

1969 births
Living people
South African Rastafarians
South African soccer players
2000 African Cup of Nations players
2002 African Cup of Nations players
2002 FIFA World Cup players
Orlando Pirates F.C. players
Bush Bucks F.C. players
Association football midfielders
Sportspeople from Cape Town
Manning Rangers F.C. players
Hellenic F.C. players
South Africa international soccer players